"Computer Love" (German version: "Computerliebe") is a song by the German electronic band Kraftwerk. It was released in 1981 on the studio album Computer World and as a single in the same year. In the UK, the song originally peaked at number 36 before it was released on 7 November 1981 as a double A-side single with "The Model", after which it went on to reach number one on the UK Singles Chart. The song was re-arranged and re-recorded for the band's 1991 studio album The Mix.

The melody of "Computer Love" was later used in Coldplay's song "Talk" on the album X&Y. Prior to release, Coldplay singer Chris Martin asked Kraftwerk for approval.

Charts

References 

Kraftwerk songs
1981 singles
1981 songs
Songs written by Karl Bartos
Songs written by Ralf Hütter
Songs written by Emil Schult
EMI Records singles
UK Singles Chart number-one singles